Legend is a posthumous compilation album by American Southern rock band Lynyrd Skynyrd that was released in 1987. It contains previously unreleased demos from the albums before the 1977 plane crash as well as non-LP B-sides. Since Legend was released, most of the tracks have also been included on other albums. 
The album was certified Gold on July 27, 2001 by the RIAA.

Track listing
"Georgia Peaches" (Steve Gaines, Ronnie Van Zant) - 3:12
"When You Got Good Friends" (Allen Collins, Van Zant) - 3:03
"Sweet Little Missy" (Gary Rossington, Van Zant) - 5:10
"Four Walls of Raiford" (Jeff Carlisi, Van Zant) - 4:15
"Simple Man" (Live) (Gary Rossington, Van Zant) - 6:35
"Truck Drivin' Man" (Ed King, Van Zant) - 5:17
"One in the Sun" (Gaines) - 5:19
"Mr. Banker" (King, Rossington, Van Zant) - 5:18
"Take Your Time" (King, Van Zant) - 7:24

Track 5 recorded on 7/7/1976 at the Fox Theatre in Atlanta, Georgia

Personnel
Ronnie Van Zant – lead vocals
Allen Collins – guitar
Gary Rossington – guitar
Billy Powell – keyboards
Artimus Pyle – drums
Leon Wilkeson – bass
Steve Gaines – guitar
Ed King – guitar
Bob Burns – drums (6,9)
Larry Junstrom – bass
Don Barnes, Steve Brookins - Track 2
Jeff Carlisi - Track 4
Ron Brooks - Track 7

Certifications

References

Lynyrd Skynyrd compilation albums
1987 compilation albums
MCA Records compilation albums